Ľuboš Kamenár (born 17 June 1987) is a Slovak footballer who plays as a goalkeeper for Spartak Trnava.

Club career
Kamenár made his first football steps in his hometown club Spartak Trnava. He went through all the youth squads, until reaching the senior team, where he made five appearances.

In February 2005, he signed for Artmedia Petržalka and in his first season there, he won the league although he was not first choice goalkeeper and played only one match. He qualified with Artmedia to the 2005–06 UEFA Champions League group stage but he did not get a chance. He became a first goalkeeper in the second half of the 2005–06 season when Juraj Čobej had to undergo treatment for a brain tumor.
He won the domestic league again in 2007–08.

On 2 July 2009, the 22-year-old Kamenár left Artmedia Petržalka to sign a five-year contract for French Nantes. He played 35 matches in his first season and finished 15th with Nantes. In the next season he lost his position in the club and moved on a half-year loan to Sivasspor. There he made only one appearance against Manisaspor. In June 2011, he signed for Sparta Prague on loan. He played 11 matches for the Sparta reserve squad. On 21 January 2012, he signed a half-year loan with option for his hometown club Spartak Trnava. Kamenar completed a season-long loan move to Scottish giants Celtic Glasgow on 31 August 2012 with the option to make the move permanent, but he eventually joined Hungarian side ETO Győr until 2016.

International career
Kamenár played his first international match for Slovakia in a 3–1 away 2010 FIFA World Cup qualifying win over San Marino on 11 October 2008. In that match, he had conceded the sole goal that San Marino managed to score in the campaign, when he was beaten by San Marino's top scorer and most caped player Andy Selva, at the end of the first half. He recorded his other international cap in a friendly match against Chile, in a 1–2 defeat at pod Dubňom in November 2009.

Honours
Petržalka
Corgoň Liga: 2004–05, 2007–08
Slovak Cup: 2007–08
Slovak Super Cup: 2005

Spartak Trnava
Slovak Cup: 2021–22

References

External links
Player profile 

1987 births
Living people
Sportspeople from Trnava
Association football goalkeepers
Slovak footballers
Slovak expatriate footballers
Slovakia under-21 international footballers
Slovakia youth international footballers
Slovakia international footballers
FC Spartak Trnava players
FC Petržalka players
FC Nantes players
Sivasspor footballers
AC Sparta Prague players
Celtic F.C. players
Győri ETO FC players
Śląsk Wrocław players
Vasas SC players
Ekstraklasa players
Slovak Super Liga players
Ligue 2 players
Süper Lig players
Nemzeti Bajnokság I players
Expatriate footballers in France
Expatriate footballers in Turkey
Expatriate footballers in the Czech Republic
Expatriate footballers in Hungary
Expatriate footballers in Poland
Slovak expatriate sportspeople in France
Slovak expatriate sportspeople in Turkey
Slovak expatriate sportspeople in the Czech Republic
Slovak expatriate sportspeople in Hungary
Slovak expatriate sportspeople in Poland